Week in Review may refer to:

 New York Week in Review, television program focused on New York State politics
 Washington Week, television program formerly known as Washington Week in Review
 Indiana Week in Review, program on Indiana PBS station WFYI (TV)
 Rush Limbaugh Week in Review, weekend edition of The Rush Limbaugh Show
 Sunday Week in Review, section of New York Times newspaper
 Week in Review, Friday feature of PBS television program A Place of Our Own
 Week in Review (Newsweek in Review), weekend edition of precursor of CBS Evening News
 Week in Review, weekend edition of syndicated radio talk program First Light (radio)
 Week in Review, feature of ESPN.com's SportsNation section
 Week in Review, feature of The Nassau Weekly newspaper